Mark McGeeney (born 28 June 1972) is an English professional darts player from Coventry, Warwickshire. He currently plays in Professional Darts Corporation (PDC) events.

Career

BDO
In August 2010, McGeeney won the Weoley Castle Open, beating Kevin Taylor in the final. In September 2014, he won the England Classic; he beat Sam Hewson in the quarter-final before beating Wesley Harms in the final. In April 2015, McGeeney won the Lincolnshire Open by beating Joshua Richardson in the Final. In September 2015, he won the British Open beating Scott Waites in the final.

McGeeney reached back-to-back Winmau World Masters finals, losing to Glen Durrant and Krzysztof Ratajski in 2016 and 2017 respectively, and won the Dutch Open. 

In 2018, after two previous 2nd round losses, McGeeney reached the final of the BDO World Darts Championship against Durrant. McGeeney came from 6–4 down in sets to lead 2–0 in the decider, but eventually lost 7–6. He became only the second player in World Championship history after Mike Gregory in 1992 to miss championship darts (one at D18 and one at D9) and lose the match. The following month, McGeeney retained his Dutch Open title, beating Durrant 3–1 in sets in the final.

In 2019, at his last appearance at a BDO World Championship McGeeney was once again knocked out in the 2nd round.

PDC
McGeeney revealed in December 2018 that he will compete in the Professional Darts Corporation's Q-School in 2019, due to new rules that allow unsuccessful Q-School competitors to compete within the BDO. After losing out in the final to Harry Ward 5–2 on the first day, he recovered to go all the way on day two, beating Carl Wilkinson 5–4 in the final to seal a two-year PDC Tour Card.

McGeeney is currently at risk of losing his PDC tour card at the end of 2021 having not managed to find his form since moving across from BDO, and as a result not making the top 64 to secure an extension, he is yet to announce if he intends to return to Q-School in 2022.

World Championship results

BDO
 2016: 2nd round (lost to Scott Mitchell 3–4)
 2017: 2nd round (lost to Scott Waites 2–4)
 2018: Runner-up (lost to Glen Durrant 6–7)
 2019: 2nd round (lost to Conan Whitehead 0–4)

PDC
 2020: 2nd round (lost to Ricky Evans 1–3)

Career finals

BDO major finals: 3 (3 runner-up)

Performance timeline
BDO

PDC

References

External links
Mark McGeeney Official Website
 
 Mark McGeeney on Facebook
 Mark McGeeney on Twitter

Living people
English darts players
British Darts Organisation players
1972 births
Professional Darts Corporation former tour card holders